Women's Downhill World Cup 1966/1967

Calendar

Final point standings

In Women's Downhill World Cup 1966/67 the best 3 results count.

Women's Downhill Team Results

All points were shown including individual deduction. bold indicate highest score - italics indicate race wins

Note:

The third race saw two winners, one from France and one from Italy.

External links
 

Women's downhill
FIS Alpine Ski World Cup women's downhill discipline titles